There were numerous conferences within the IHSAA that were made up of schools based entirely in one county. Many of these "County Conferences" also contained schools from neighboring counties that were either geographically closer or smaller than the other schools in their home county. These conferences would fold when schools would consolidate and seek out other, more expansive conferences that included similar-sized schools. The starting date of many of these conferences is hard to confirm, so the listing for many of these leagues uses the earliest date that can be confirmed.

Adams County Conference
This conference predates the end of World War II, and most of its members shared membership with the Eastern Indiana Conference (EIC). The last non-EIC member closed in 1956, and this county league folded the next year.

 Concurrent in ACC and EIC from 1953 to 1957.
 Concurrent in ACC and EIC from 1954 to 1957.

Bartholomew County Conference

Bartholomew-Shelby County League
Originally the Shelby County League, 
the conference became a rare arrangement where all of the non-city schools from two counties played in the same conference in 1928, as Clifford and Hope became the only two schools remaining from the Bartholomew County Conference. Rather than just absorbing the two schools, the league rebranded under the BSCL moniker. Once Hauser left in 1961, the league took the old SCL name for three seasons, until the three remaining schools rejoined Hauser in the Mid-Hoosier Conference.

Benton County Conference
The conference was founded in 1911, and stayed largely intact until the 1950s.

Blackford County Conference
A three school conference of schools from Blackford County, it ended

 Played concurrently in BCC and CIAC 1945-53.

Boone County Conference
The conference began in 1920, and folded in 1964, as only two schools remained.

Brown County Conference
Another triangular conference within Brown County, all three schools consolidated into Brown County High School in 1961.

 Changed name from Broncos in the 1930s.

Carroll County Conference

Cass County Conference
All schools were located in Cass County, Indiana. The conference formed in 1922 and folded in 1963.

 Was Walton before 1953.

Clark County Conference

Clay County Conference

Clinton County Conference

Daviess County Conference

 Was Barr Township before 1965.

Dearborn County Conference

Decatur County Conference
All schools were located in Decatur County. Conference folded in 1968 as all schools consolidated into either North Decatur or South Decatur high schools.

DeKalb County Conference

 Concurrent with DCC and SCC 1935-53.
 Known as St. Joe before 1943.

Delaware County Conference
All schools were located in Delaware County. The conference is one of the oldest confirmed, having competed since at least 1931, if not earlier. The conference folded in 1968 as the remaining five schools in the league consolidated into two.

 Albany played concurrently in the DCC and the Eastern Indiana Conference 1953-68.

Elkhart County Conference
Founded in 1922, the conference folded in 1969 as its four remaining schools were consolidated down to two.

 Was Baugo Township before 1961.

Fayette County Conference

 Played concurrently in FCC and WVC 1940-58.

Fountain County Athletic Association

 Played concurrently in the FCAA and WRC 1964-65.
 Played concurrently in the FCAA and Midwest Conference 1932-47.

Franklin County Conference

 Played concurrently in FCC and Southeastern Indiana Conference 1930-40.
 Played concurrently in FCC and WVC 1940-41.

Fulton County Conference

Gibson County Conference

 Concurrent with Pocket 1939-49.
 Concurrent with Pocket 1938-49.

Grant County Conference

 Concurrently played in GCC and Mississinewa Valley Conference 1952-65.
 Concurrently played in GCC and North Central Conference 1933-65.
 Concurrently played in GCC and Tri-County Conference from 1955 until closing.

Greene County Conference

 Was Switz City before 1947.
 Team name was Switzers before 1947.

Hamilton County Conference
Originally a 10-team conference located in Hamilton County (though Sheridan's attendance zone included a township in Boone County), consolidation and attendance disparities forced the remaining four schools to part ways. Noblesville became independent for some years, while the other three schools (including the newly formed Hamilton Heights, and Fishers, renamed as Hamilton Southeastern) left for the Mid-Capital.

 Carmel played in both the CDC and HCC from 1952 to 1958.
 Fishers opened a new high school with a new mascot and colors, Hamilton Southeastern, in 1965. It is considered a renaming rather than a consolidation because no other high schools consolidated with Fishers.
 Sheridan played in both the HCC and the Hoosier Conference 1948-65.
 Jackson Central played in both the HCC and CDC 1961-65.

Hancock County Conference
The Hancock County Conference is one of the few conferences that had an abundance of competitive members when it folded, as it was merged with the East Central Conference in 1962.

Harrison County Conference
Originally formed in 1914, this conference is notable for having two schools from a different county (Georgetown and Mount St. Francis Seminary in Floyd County) as members for its duration.

 Known as Corydon before 1950.
 Played concurrently in the HCC and Southeastern Indiana Conference 1930-58.
 Played concurrently in HCC and BRC 1959-62.
 Known as Palmyra before 1925.
 Known as New Salisbury before 1955.

Hendricks County Conference
The conference was formed in 1914
, and ended in 1965 when the conference was reduced to three schools

 Concurrent with Big 4 Conference 1955-65.

Henry County Conference

 Concurrent with Mid-Eastern Conference from 1963 until closing.
 Concurrent with MEC 1964-67.

Howard County Conference
The Howard County Conference began in 1919, and was one of the first of the modern County Conferences to fold, as it was down to three schools by 1950 (Kokomo played in the North Central, and Taylor had not been created by that point). These schools joined with schools from Miami County to form the Howard-Miami Conference.

Huntington County Conference
The Huntington County Conference was formed in 1919 and ended in 1966, as all the public high schools in the county consolidated with Huntington to become Huntington North.

Jackson County Conference
The Jackson County Conference (originally Jackson County Athletic Association) was formed in 1921, containing all eleven schools in the county. The conference had fallen to three schools by 1965, and folded in 1967, as the only school that didn't hold membership in the Dixie-Monon Conference joined that league.

 Played concurrently in the JCC and Dixie Athletic Conference 1962-65.
 Played concurrently in the JCC and Dixie Athletic Conference 1961-65.
 Played concurrently in the JCC and Southern Monon Conference 1959-65.
 Played concurrently in the JCC and DMC 1965-67.

Jasper County Conference

Jay County Conference
Jay County's schools were largely self-contained in this league, except for Portland. The league shrank to four members by 1967, and the conference folded into the Eastern Indiana Conference.

 Schools played in both EIC and JCC from 1953 until 1967.
 Portland played concurrently in the JCC and MVC 1952-54.

Jefferson County Conference

Johnson County Conference
One of the county leagues to extend past its geographic borders, Morgantown (from Morgan County played in the Conference throughout its existence.

 Played concurrently in the JCC and MHC 1965-67.
 Maroons before 1955.
 Played concurrently in the JCC and MCC 1920-35, and the JCC and Tri-County (Central) 1935-39.
 Bluebirds before 1958.
 Wrens before 1939.

Knox County Conference
One of the larger county leagues in southern Indiana, the league had eleven members until the creation of North Knox in 1963, and folded with the creation of South Knox in 1968.

Kosciusko County Conference
Kosciusko County's league was notable for the fact it had schools from two other counties, Fulton (Akron), and Whitley (Larwill and South Whitley). These schools would eventually consolidate with schools in the county to form new school districts.

LaGrange County Conference

 Concurrent with the State Corner Conference from 1935 to 1941.
 Was Shipshewana until 1955.
 Concurrent with the State Corner Conference from 1941 until closing.

Lawrence County Conference

One of the longer-lasting county conferences, despite the fact it had shrank to three schools by 1963. Heltonville joined its sister schools on the Dixie-Monon Conference in 1970, folding the league, though all three and schools (as well as the DMC) were gone by 1974.

 Played concurrently in Southern Monon Conference and LCC 1959-65, and DMC and LCC 1965-70.
 Played concurrently in Southern Monon Conference and LCC 1958-65, and DMC and LCC 1965-70.
 Played concurrently in Southern Monon Conference and LCC 1959-63.

Marion County Athletic Association

The first attempt by the township schools in Marion County to organize competition, the league organized a basketball tournament in the winter of 1928, then organized a season schedule in the 1928-29 school year. The league broke up in 1945, as all but three schools had found other conferences to join. The schools would all later reunite (minus Southport) in the Central Suburban Conference in 1971, though this would only last a few years. Today the Township schools are either in Conference Indiana or the Metropolitan Interscholastic Conference.

  Was New Augusta until 1942.

Marshall County Conference

 Played concurrently in MCC and NLC 1963-66.

Martin County Conference

 Concurrent with MCC and SWIAC 1939-43.
 School consolidated into Williams, Lawrence County, attendance area was transferred to Shoals in 1963.

Miami County Conference

Monroe County Conference

Montgomery County Conference
Often credited as the cradle of Indiana basketball, Montgomery County was home to three of the first four State Champions in the sport. When combined with neighboring Boone and Tippecanoe Counties, the area claimed the first eight winners. The conference lasted until 1966, when all schools folded into the Big 4 Conference.

Morgan County Conference

 Played concurrently in the MCC and Johnson County Conference 1920-35.

Newton County Conference

 Played concurrently in NCC and MAC 1932-33.

Noble County Conference

 Concurrent with the State Corner Conference from 1935 to 1941.
 Concurrent with the State Corner Conference from 1935 until closing.

Orange County Conference
The conference ended in 1939, as all members joined either the Southeastern Indiana Conference or Southwestern Indiana Conference.

 Played concurrently in the OCC and SEIC 1930-39.

Owen County Conference

Parke County Conference

Perry County Conference
Containing twelve schools at its beginning, the league was down to four schools by 1949. The conference managed to survive for another 13 years, until consolidation left it with two remaining schools, both with outside conference affiliation.

 Played concurrently in PCC and PAC 1938-62.
 Played concurrently in BRC and PCC 1959-62.
 Played concurrently in PCC and PAC 1938-49.

Pike County Conference
The PCC was started in 1914, and was one of the later county conferences to fold, as the last of the four schools that had not joined the Patoka Valley Conference did so in 1964.

 Concurrent with PCC and PVC 1959-64.
 Concurrent with PCC and PAC 1938-49.
 Concurrent with PCC and PAC 1939-40.

Posey County Conference

 Played concurrently in PAC and PCC 1938-49.
 Played concurrently in PAC and PCC 1938-58.

Putnam County Conference

Randolph County Conference
Formed in 1913, the conference was one of the largest county leagues, containing 18 schools at one point. The conference ended in 1964, as almost all the remaining schools joined (or were already part of) the Mid-Eastern Conference.

 Was Saratoga before 1955.
 Ward Township residents went to school in Winchester after consolidation, while Jackson Township residents went to Union City.
 Played concurrently in the RCC and Mid-Eastern Conference 1963-64.

Ripley County Conference

Rush County Conference

Spencer County Conference

 Played concurrently in SCC and PAC 1938-59, and SCC and PVC 1959-65.
 Played concurrently in SCC and PAC 1939-65.
 Was Richland City until 1943.
 Played concurrently in SCC and PAC 1938-65.

Starke County Conference

 Played concurrently in SCC and KVC 1935-48)

Steuben County Conference

 Concurrent with State Corner Conference from 1935 to 1941.
 Concurrent with State Corner Conference from 1941 until 1964.

Tippecanoe County Conference

Tipton County Conference

Union County Conference

 Played concurrently in UCC and PCC throughout duration in conference.

Vermillion County Conference
While possibly having been organized earlier, the VCC was definitively established in 1923. The conference ended in 1964, as the three remaining schools combined to form North Vermillion High School.

Vigo County Conference

Wabash County Conference

 Was Linlawn before 1953.

Warren County Conference
A small, triangular conference (with only three schools in the county) for most of its existence, the conference existed in two versions with the same schools (opting not to compete from 1934 to 1947, as all members were within the Midwest Conference). While Seeger started as a renaming of West Lebanon in 1959 rather than a consolidation, it is given its own entry, since its nickname and colors were different as well.

 Concurrent with MWC 1932-34.
 Concurrent with WRC 1964-73.

Warrick County Conference

 Played concurrently in WCC and PAC 1939-41.
 Played concurrently in WCC and PAC 1938-59, and WCC and PVC 1959-65.1

Washington County Conference

Wayne County Conference

Wells County Conference
The Wells County Conference dated back to at least 1904, and lasted until 1966, when only one school remained open.

 Lancaster Central played concurrently in the EIC and WCC from 1954 to 1959, then in the EWVC and WCC until both folded in 1966.

White County Conference
One of the oldest confirmed county conferences, the alliance dates back to at least 1908.

Whitley County League
Begun before 1916, the league folded in 1958, as the six schools consolidated down to three.

References 

Indiana high school athletic conferences
High school sports conferences and leagues in the United States